Methode Electronics (NYSE: MEI ) is an American multinational company headquartered in Chicago, Illinois, with engineering, manufacturing and sales operations in more than 35 locations in 14 countries. The company employs around 4,566 people worldwide.

References

Electronics manufacturing
Companies listed on the New York Stock Exchange
1946 establishments in the United States
Electrical connectors